Pervokizlyarskoye is a rural locality (a selo) in Kosyakinsky Selsoviet, Kizlyarsky District, Republic of Dagestan, Russia. The population was 438 as of 2010. There are 3 streets.

Geography 
Pervokizlyarskoye is located 5 km northwest of Kizlyar (the district's administrative centre) by road. Kosyakino and Imeni Shaumyana are the nearest rural localities.

Nationalities 
Avars and Laks live there.

References 

Rural localities in Kizlyarsky District